Erin Ambrose (born April 30, 1994) is a Canadian women's ice hockey player with the PWHPA and the Canadian national team. She made her debut with the Canada women's national ice hockey team at the 2014 4 Nations Cup.

Playing career
At the age of 11, Ambrose moved from AA to AAA boys hockey, and in her second season, she was named team captain.  She began to play women's ice hockey as a 14-year-old in 2008. She competed for Ontario Blue at the 2008 National Women's Under-18 Championship and participated in all five games. Ontario Blue had a fourth-place finish at the tournament in Napanee, Ont. In 2009, she was invited to Canada's National Women's Under-18 Team. She was one of seven defenders named to the final roster, making her the second 15-year-old (after teammate Kaleigh Fratkin) to suit up for the under-18 squad. On February 19, 2012, Ambrose became the all-time scoring leader among defenders in Provincial Women's Hockey League history. She recorded a three-point game versus the Mississauga Jr. Chiefs to surpass Laura Fortino.

Hockey Canada
Ambrose was part of Canada's National Women's Under-18 Team to a gold medal at the 2010 IIHF World Women's Under-18 Championship in Chicago. As a member of the gold medal-winning squad, a hockey card of her was featured in the Upper Deck 2010 World of Sports card series. In addition, she participated in the Canada Celebrates Event on June 30 in Edmonton, Alberta which recognized the Canadian Olympic and World hockey champions from the 2009–10 season .

During the 2011–12 Canada women's national ice hockey team season, she was a member of the Canadian National Under 18 team that participated in a three-game series vs. the US in August 2011. In addition, she was named the team captain. She was part of the gold medal-winning Team Ontario Red squad at the 2011 Canadian National Women's Under-18 Championships In the second game of the 2012 IIHF World Women's U18 Championship (contested on January 1, 2012), Erin Ambrose earned two points in a 6–0 shutout of Germany.

On January 11, 2022, Ambrose was named to Canada's 2022 Olympic team.

NCAA
On January 16, 2012, it was announced that Ambrose committed to join the Clarkson Golden Knights women's ice hockey program in autumn 2012. Ambrose was the leading rookie scorer among all defenders in the NCAA, recording 36 points. Her 30 assists were a program record, while her 1.06 points per game made her one of only three blueliners in NCAA points to average at least one point per game.

To begin her sophomore season, Ambrose amassed five and four-point performances, including hat tricks in consecutive games. Such performances took place against the RIT Tigers and St. Lawrence Skating Saints. She would finish said season as the co-winner of ECAC Hockey's Best Defensive Defenseman Award.

Serving as an assistant captain in her junior and senior seasons, the junior season would be highlighted by recording the 100th point of her career with the Golden Knights. Becoming the ninth player in program history to reach the century club, she achieved the feat on January 10, 2015, scoring a goal in a 1–1 draw versus conference rival Cornell.

In her senior season, she missed the first nine games due to injury. Despite the setback, she would log 28 points on the strength of 21 assists. The last goal of her NCAA career was scored on March 5, 2016, against the Colgate Raiders. She would also record two assists in the game for a three-point performance. In the previous game (a February 27 tilt with the Cornell Big Red), Ambrose would record four assists, her best offensive output for the season.

NWHL
In the 2015 NWHL Draft, she was selected by the New York Riveters.

CWHL
After being released from Hockey Canada's Centralization camp, Ambrose was traded from the Toronto Furies to Les Canadiennes de Montreal. Taking place on December 13, 2017, the Furies received first, and third-round picks in the 2018 CWHL Draft, a first-round pick from the 2019 CWHL Draft, plus a third-round pick from the 2020 CWHL Draft.

Making her debut with Les Canadiennes on December 16, she recorded a pair of assists, including an assist on the overtime winner by Kayla Tutino, a 5–4 win versus the Markham Thunder.

With Les Canadiennes, Ambrose would make appear in the 2019 Clarkson Cup, challenging the Calgary Inferno. Ambrose would gain an assist in the game, a 5–2 loss to Calgary.

Career statistics

PWHL

Hockey Canada

NCAA

CWHL

Awards and honours
Directorate Award, Best Defender, 2012 IIHF World Women's U18 Championship.

NCAA
ECAC Rookie of the Week (Week of October 23, 2012)
2013 ECAC Hockey Rookie of the Year 
2013 Second-Team ECAC All-Star 
2013 All-USCHO.com All-Star team
2014 First-Team All-American 
2014 Top 10 Patty Kazmaier Memorial Award finalist
2015 ECAC Hockey Third-Team All-League 
2016 First-Team ECAC Hockey All-Star
2016, Finalist for ECAC Hockey Best Defenseman Award
2016 ECAC Hockey All-Tournament team

CWHL
2018–19, CWHL Defender of the Year

Personal
In October 2020, Ambrose wrote a piece for Hockey Canada detailing her struggles with depression, also revealing her same-sex preference. In December 2020, she pledged to donate her brain to science for concussion research after her death.

References

External links

1994 births
Living people
Canadian expatriate ice hockey players in the United States
Canadian women's ice hockey defencemen
Clarkson Golden Knights women's ice hockey players
Ice hockey people from Ontario
Ice hockey players at the 2022 Winter Olympics
Medalists at the 2022 Winter Olympics
Olympic gold medalists for Canada
Olympic medalists in ice hockey
Les Canadiennes de Montreal players
Lesbian sportswomen
Canadian LGBT sportspeople
LGBT ice hockey players
Olympic ice hockey players of Canada
People from Georgina, Ontario
Professional Women's Hockey Players Association players
Toronto Furies players